Massimo Barbolini (born 29 August 1964) is an Italian volleyball coach. He is coach of Turkey women's national volleyball team, and Galatasaray SK. Coaching Italy women's national volleyball team, he has won the 2007 and 2009 Women's European Volleyball Championship.

Career
Born in Modena, as a boy he played volleyball as setter but was forced to retired from volleyball due to a serious injury when he was 20 years old. He soon become assistant coach of Julio Velasco at Panini Modena then in 1989 he was named coach of Sanyo Agrigento. With the Sicilian team he reached the Italian serie A1 (first division) then he trained Modena Volley.

In 1993 he was named coach of Latte Rugiada Matera, his first assignment in woman volleyball. With that team he won  two Italian championship and two Italy Cup a European Supercup and a European Champions League. After a year with Gierre Roma, he was named coach of Despar Sirio of Perugia. With the Deapar Sirio, which he trained from 1997/1998 to 2006/2007, he  won 3 Italian championship (2003, 2005 and 2007), a European Champions League (2006) and a European Cup Winner's Cup, two CEV Cups, as well as 4 Italy Cup (1999, 2003, 2005, 2007).

In the August 2006, after the firing of Marco Bonitta from Italy women's national volleyball team, Barbolini led the team in the World Championship to the 4th place.

In summer 2007 the Italy women's national volleyball team arrived third at Grand Prix and won its first European Championship. In November 2007 Barbolini's team also won the 2007 Volleyball World Cup. At 2008 summer olympics the Italian team managed by Barbolini was defeated by the USA at the quarter final match.

In 2009 he led the Italian woman volleyball national team to the victory at European championship. In 2011 he led the Italian national team to the victory of 2011 FIVB Women's Volleyball World Cup

References and sources

Despar Sirio website 
September 2007 Edition of monthly magazine Pallavolo Supervolley

1964 births
Living people
Sportspeople from Modena
Italian volleyball coaches
Volleyball coaches of international teams
Italian expatriate sportspeople in Turkey
Galatasaray S.K. (women's volleyball) coaches